The following is a list of rugby league footballers who have scored at least 100 tries in the Super League competition. 

Tries scored in regular season, playoffs, and Super 8's are included. Tries scored in other competitions such as the Challenge Cup or The Qualifiers are excluded.

Players
Statistics correct as of 19 March 2023 
Bold indicates players still active in Super League, current club in bold too  
Italics indicate player still active but not in Super League

Players to score 100 Super League tries and 300 Super League goals

References

 

S